Magali Léger  is a contemporary French light soprano.

Biography 
Originally from Guadeloupe, Léger was a student of Christiane Eda-Pierre. In 1999, she won a First prize at the Conservatoire de Paris.

In 2003 she was nominated in the "Révélations" category of the Victoires de la musique.

Discography 
 Mottetti e Sonata da chiesa (motets and church sonatas), Georg Friedrich Haendel, Magali Léger and the RosaSolis ensemble, Musica Ficta, 2009.
 La Bonne Chanson, Gabriel Fauré, Magali Léger/Michaël Levinas, M&A 2008.
 Médée, opera by Michèle Reverdy, Mandala 2004.
 Pergolesi & Porpora, Cantate e Sonata da camera (Pergolesi and Porpora, cantatas and chamber sonatas), Magali Léger and RosaSolis.
 Astor Piazzola, Magali Léger and pianist Marcela Roggeri, Transart Live.
 La Métamorphose, opera by Michael Levinas, Aeon, 2012.
 Debussy : complete mélodies, Ligia Digital, décembre 2014.

Videography 
 "Rameau, Maître à Danser" - Daphnis et Eglé - La naissance d'Osiris, Les Arts Florissants, conducted by William Christie, Outhere Music, 2014.

References

External links 
 Magali Léger - J’ai deux amours - Live @ Paris en fête
 Personal website
 Magali Léger on Une autre Histoire
 Magali Léger on ResMusica
 Offenbach : Magali Léger - Florian Laconi (YouTube)

French operatic sopranos
Conservatoire de Paris alumni
Date of birth missing (living people)
Year of birth missing (living people)
Living people